The Goorkha Craters are a line of snow-free coastal hills  long, standing  east of Cooper Nunatak between Carlyon Glacier and Darwin Glacier in Antarctica. They were discovered and named by the British National Antarctic Expedition ( (1901–04).

References

Hills of Oates Land